The Flag of Suriname was legally adopted on 25 November 1975, upon the independence of Suriname from the Netherlands.

The flag was designed as a result of a national competition. It was raised for the first time on the Independence Day of the Republic of Suriname. There is a legal requirement for vessels to raise the flag of Suriname when visiting another country to reduce miscommunication between other countries.

Description 
The flag of Suriname is composed of five horizontal bands of green (top, double width), white, red (quadruple width), white, and green (double width) with a large, yellow, five-pointed star in the center.

The color red represents progress, white represents freedom and justice and the green represents the fertility of the land. The yellow star represents unity and a golden future.

Shapes and design

Flag of Suriname 
The flag was designed as a result of a national competition, with the winning design being accepted by the Suriname parliament in 1975. Jack Pinas, art teacher and graphic designer, won the design competition. However, some changes on Pinas' design were made.

The green horizontal band on both the top and bottom of the flag represents the richness of the countries agricultural lands; the white horizontal band represents freedom and independence and red symbolizes progress and hope. The star on center of the flag reflects the sacrifices endured for the Surinamese independence as well as the unity of the country and a bright future. The Suriname political parties are indicated by the different colors that are used in the flag.

Coat of arms 
In 1770, the coat of arms belonged to the City of Amsterdam. However, in 1975, the year of Suriname's independence, Suriname introduced a new coat of arms to acknowledge and respect the indigenous population as well as to represent the new country.

It consists of two Arawak Indians who represent the unity of the Indigenous people. The bright yellow star in the center symbolizes the people that migrated to Suriname including America, Asia, Africa, Australia, and Europe. The green diamond shape in the middle represents a hart.

The oval shape shield that is divided into two portrays a boat on the left side and rain forest on the right. The boat on the left side represent the history of slavery in Suriname and the people that were shipped from Africa. The right side of the shield, symbolizes justice. At the bottom shield there is a banner stating 'JUSTITIA PIETAS FIDES'. Justitia means 'justified', Pietas means faithfulness towards God, family and country, and lastly, Fides means loyalty to commitment.

In 1682 the coat of Suriname was still belonged to the Dutch West India Company, until Suriname established 'Society of Suriname' in 1683.

Flag Day

Independence Day 

On the 25th of November 1975, Suriname gained freedom and became an independent country after years of colonization by the Netherlands. Prime Minister Henck Arron (1973–1980) officially approved Suriname's national anthem, national flag, and the coat of arms.

The ceremony took place in the Paramaribo Presidential Palace, facing towards the Independence Square (Onafhankelijkheidsplein). The palace was open to the public for the Surinamese citizens. Prior to the proclamation, the leaders of Indo-Surinamese and Creole with Lachmon and Arron were finally reunited on 25 November. Following the proclamation, children formed together to celebrate.

Soldiers and police officers prepared a parade in front of the Presidential Palace (Onafhankelijkheidsplein). On that day, the Surinamese flag was raised everywhere by the citizens of Suriname to celebrate the Republic of Suriname's Independence Day. The Day of Freedoms also called 'Dag der Vrijheden' was officially announced as a national day in 1960 which is commemorated yearly by the countries ethnic groups.

At sea

Maritime flag 
Section 7 of Part XII of the Law of the Sea Convention is a law that protects the marine environment from pollution. It also states that any of Suriname's marine vessels traveling outside the country are required to raise the Suriname flag. The maritime regulation was issued by the International Maritime Organization (IMO), to provide safety and procedure for vessels to traveling outside the country.

Fleet management is responsible for whether each vessel has a suitable flag based on their country. The raised flag indicates where the vessels came from, serving as an important indicator to communicate under the International Code of Signals. Illegal fishers who do not have legal verification to fish can be reported to the illegal, unreported, unregulated fishing (IUU). This illegal action can be caught and identified by the flag state of the vessels.

Other flags

Flag used in 1815–1959 
After the establishment of the Kingdom of the Netherlands in 1815, the Dutch tricolor was used in the Dutch colony of Suriname. There was talk of a design for a colony flag with the Dutch tricolor with the coat of arms of Suriname in the white area, but in practice this was not used.

The Governor's flag before 1959 was the flag of the Netherlands with white circles in the top left corner. The same Governor Flag was also used by the Governors of the Netherlands Antilles and Netherlands New Guinea respectively.

First flag 1959–1975 
After the signing of the Charter for the Kingdom of the Netherlands on 15 December 1954, the need arose for Suriname's own official flag, coat of arms and anthem.

The pre-independence flag was designed by Noni Lichtveld and was adopted in 1959. It consisted of five coloured stars connected by a black ellipse with a plain white background. The coloured stars represented the major ethnic groups that comprise the Surinamese population, being black (Africans), brown (Indians), yellow (Javanese and Chinese), red (Amerindians), and white (Europeans). The ellipse represented the harmonious relationship among the groups.

This flag was also used as the Governor flag. However, the flag was criticized by the wider public for putting too much emphasis on the ethnic differences and therefore symbolizing less of the national unity of the Surinamese people. It was changed to the current flag in 1975 after a nationwide contest.

References

External links 

Flags introduced in 1975
National flags
Flag